Ancient Shores is a science fiction novel by American writer Jack McDevitt, published in 1996. It was nominated for the Nebula Award for Best Novel in 1997.
A continuation of this novel by the same writer was published in 2015, entitled Thunderbird.

Plot summary

A vast lake, known as Lake Agassiz, covered much of North Dakota, Manitoba and Minnesota during prehistoric times.

The story begins when farmer Tom Lasker and his son, Will, uncover a seemingly brand new yacht. Found on a landlocked farm, it draws tourists to the area. Max Collingswood, a friend of Tom's, tries to help discover the origins of the boat. Collingswood enlists April Cannon, a worker at a chemical lab who discovers that the yacht is made of an unknown material. In fact, it is a fiberglass-like material with an impossible atomic number (161).

Collingswood and Cannon discover something else on a nearby ridge which is part of a Sioux reservation. The Sioux assist in its excavation and examination. It turns out to be a green glassy roundhouse-like structure, made from the same material.

Eventually, they gain access to it, revealing a dock for the sailboat, but no entrance for it. The discovery that the structure contains the means to access other sites not on Earth sets off a struggle between the Government and the Reservation for control of it.

Characters 
Tom Lasker – farmer
Max Collingswood – Tom's friend
April Cannon – chemist
Arky Redfern - Sioux tribal member and lawyer for the tribe
James Walker - Chairman of the Sioux tribe
Elizabeth Silvera – government worker

References

External links

 Ancient Shores at Worlds Without End

1996 American novels
1996 science fiction novels
Novels set in North Dakota
Novels by Jack McDevitt
American science fiction novels
HarperCollins books